Rompilli or Rompalli or Rompalle is a village and panchayat in Ramabhadrapuram mandal of Vizianagaram district, Andhra Pradesh, India.

There is a railway station at Rompalli in the branch railway line between Salur and Bobbili. Daily rail bus services are operated between these stations.

In the 2011 census it had a population of 2625 in 663 households.

References

Villages in Vizianagaram district